The scope listed in the table is top prefectures by GDP per capita over ten thousand US dollars, including direct-administered municipalities and special administrative regions that are roughly comparable in area and economic volume. The unit of measurement for the data listed is the local currency Chinese yuan. In order to facilitate international comparison, the local currency is converted into US dollars.

Methodology 
According to the administrative divisions of China, there are three level of cities: municipalities, prefecture-level cities, and county-level cities. A prefecture-level city (地级市) is not a "city" in the strictest sense of the term, but instead an administrative unit comprising, typically, both an urban area (a city in the strict sense) and surrounding rural or less-urbanized areas usually many times the size of the central, built-up core.

Prefecture-level cities nearly always contain multiple counties, county-level cities, and other such sub-divisions. To distinguish a prefecture-level city from its actual urban area (city in the strict sense), the term "urban area" (市区 shìqū) is used.

Methods and accuracy in the reporting of population and economic activity vary widely, hence these figures should be seen as estimates rather than facts. Some cities do not include migrant workers in the population count, even though the output they generate are counted in the total GDP, resulting in an inflated GDP per capita.

2020 List

See also 

 Economy of China
 Historical GDP of China
 List of Chinese administrative divisions by GDP
 List of Chinese administrative divisions by GDP per capita
 List of Chinese prefecture-level cities by GDP
 Prefecture-level city
 List of cities in China by population
 List of cities in China
 List of twin towns and sister cities in China
 Sub-provincial division
 List of capitals in China
 List of country subdivisions by GDP over 200 billion US dollars
 List of cities in China by population
 List of renminbi exchange rates
 Provincial city
 Administrative divisions of China
 Global city

References

External links
PRC National Bureau of Statistics

Prefecture Level Cities By Gdp Per Capita
Gdp
Prefecture Level Cities By Gdp Per Capita
Gdp Per Capita
Prefecture Level Cities By Gdp Per Capita
Lists of cities by GDP